Mavor may refer to:

 Mavor Island, Qikiqtaaluk Region, Nunavut, Canada

People
 Mavor Moore (1919–2006), Canadian writer, producer, and actor
 Dora Mavor Moore (1888–1979), Canadian actress and theater director

People with the surname
 Carol Mavor, American writer and professor
 Elinor Mavor, American science fiction editor
 Elizabeth Mavor (1927–2013),  British writer
 Freya Mavor (born 1993), Scottish actress and model
 James Mavor (1854–1925), Canadian economist 
 Leslie Mavor (1916–1991), Scottish Royal Air Force officer
 Mike Mavor, New Zealand rugby union player
 William Fordyce Mavor (1758–1837), Scottish teacher, priest and writer

See also
 Mavora Lakes, South Island of New Zealand